The Call Mountains are a mountain range in San Benito County, California.

References 

Mountain ranges of Northern California
Mountain ranges of San Benito County, California